The 2022–23 Oklahoma State Cowboys basketball team represents Oklahoma State University during the 2022–23 NCAA Division I men's basketball season. The team is led by sixth-year head coach Mike Boynton, and plays its home games at Gallagher-Iba Arena in Stillwater, Oklahoma as a member of the Big 12 Conference.

Previous season
The Cowboys finished the 2021–22 season 15–15, 8–10 in Big 12 play to finish in a tie for fifth place. On November 3, 2021, the NCAA ruled Oklahoma State ineligible for postseason play for the season due to players receiving improper benefits.

Offseason

Departures

Incoming transfers

Recruiting classes

2022 recruiting class

2023 recruiting class

Roster

Schedule and results

|-
!colspan=12 style=| Exhibition

|-
!colspan=12 style=| Regular season

|-
!colspan=12 style=| Big 12 tournament

|-
!colspan=12 style=| NIT

References

Oklahoma State Cowboys basketball seasons
Oklahoma State Cowboys
Oklahoma State Cowboys basketball
Oklahoma State Cowboys basketball
Oklahoma State